The 1928 King's Birthday Honours in New Zealand, celebrating the official birthday of King George V, were appointments made by the King on the recommendation of the New Zealand government to various orders and honours to reward and highlight good works by New Zealanders. They were announced on 4 June 1928.

The recipients of honours are displayed here as they were styled before their new honour.

Knight Bachelor
 The Honourable George Fowlds  – of Auckland; president of Auckland University College. For public services.

Order of Saint Michael and Saint George

Companion (CMG)
 The Very Reverend Alfred Robertson Fitchett  – dean of Dunedin.
 Henry James Manson – New Zealand trade commissioner in Australia.

Order of the British Empire

Commander (CBE)
Civil division
 Robert Noble Jones – chief judge of the Native Land Court and under-secretary for Native Affairs.
 Mary McLean  – lately principal of Wellington Girls' College.

Companion of the Imperial Service Order (ISO)
 Captain John Bollons – master of SS Tutanekai, Marine Department.

References

Birthday Honours
1928 awards
1928 in New Zealand
New Zealand awards